The 2003 LPGA Championship was the 49th LPGA Championship, played June 5–8 at DuPont Country Club in Wilmington, Delaware.

Annika Sörenstam won in a playoff over Grace Park with a par on the first sudden death hole. It was the first of three consecutive LPGA Championships for Sorenstam and the fifth of her ten major titles.

Two weeks earlier, Sörenstam played in a PGA Tour event, the Colonial in Fort Worth, Texas.

The DuPont Country Club hosted this championship for eleven consecutive seasons, from 1994 through 2004.

Past champions in the field

Made the cut

Source:

Missed the cut

Source:

Final leaderboard
Sunday, June 8, 2003

Source:

Playoff
The sudden-death playoff began on the par-4 18th hole, where Park missed the green, chipped from the heavy rough to  but failed to save par.

Sudden-death playoff played on hole 18.

References

External links
Golf Observer leaderboard
DuPont Country Club

Women's PGA Championship
Golf in Delaware
LPGA Championship
LPGA Championship
LPGA Championship
LPGA Championship
Women's sports in Delaware